Nikolay Vasilyevich Belyaev (Russian: Николай Васильевич Беляев) (27 April 1859 – 15 February 1920) was a Russian philanthropist, entrepreneur, founder and chairman of the Upper Volga Railway Society.

Biography
Nikolay Belyaev was born to a professor’s family in Moscow, Russia. Due to his father’s professional achievements, the family received the hereditary nobility status in 1884. In 1879, he graduated from the Cadet Corps in Orel Bakhtin Military Gymnasium.

Nikolay Belyaev served as treasurer of the newly-founded Alexandrinsky Community of Sisters of Mercy, named after Empress Alexandra Feodorovna, under the Committee of Christian Relief of the Russian Red Cross Society. It organized a comprehensive system of nursing services throughout Russia. For his services to the community, Nikolay Belyaev was awarded the Order of St. Anna and the Order of St. Stanislaus of the 3rd class. In 1900 he became a State Councillor. He also participated in the Committee for Assistance to the poorest students of the 4th Moscow Gymnasium.

Entrepreneurship
Together with similar-minded entrepreneurs, he founded and later chaired the Society for the Construction and Operation of the Upper Volga Railway which built and ran a railway line in the north of Moscow. Nikolay Belyaev was one of the initiators of the creation of the railway, which was an alternative to the upper Volga river route. For a rapidly developing industry and trade in forests, more reliable and high-speed transport was required. Thus, the idea of building a railway was strongly supported by the regional officials and by entrepreneurs.  The railway was constructed in 1914-1918, and later finished in the 1930s.

Once privately owned, this railway is now part of the October Railway and connects Moscow with Kalyazin and Uglich.

Nikolay Belyaev was also a member of the jewelry trading house D.P.&M Frolov and of the Moscow Automobile Society, organizing public car races and developing early traffic regulations. He owned one of the first Mercedes Benz automobiles in Moscow.

As a liberal-minded member of the Constitutional Democratic Party, Nikolay Belyaev aimed to reform the Russian state as a candidate for the Moscow City Duma. He supported the Provisional Government.  The February Revolution proved to be a severe challenge for him and his family. While some members of the family fought in the White Army and heavily engaged in anti-bolshevik activities (and subsequently fled the country), others stayed and suffered repressions, until finally adapting for the new regime.

On 15 February 1920, Nikolay Belyaev died under unknown circumstances in the Trinity Lavra of St. Sergius. Nikolay Belyaev was the last owner of the Golovin estate on Potapovsky Lane in Moscow.

Family network
His father, Vasily Alexeyevich Belyaev (1823-1881), was a professor at the Lazarev Institute of Oriental Languages. His mother, Olga Mikhailovna Belyaeva (1833-1912), was from the Frolov family, who were Moscow merchant jewelers. 

Nikolay Belyaev was married to Alexandra Alexandrovna Belyaeva (1865-1954), who originated from the well-known Moscow merchant family Alexeev. Her father and grandfather owned the Lubyansky passage in Moscow. She emigrated to Nice.  They had eight children amongst whom the eldest, Alexander (1891-1977), emigrated to Berlin and later to Munich after fighting in the White Army. Another son, Viktor Belyaev (1896 – 1955) became a renowned Soviet aircraft designer.

His brother Sergey Belyaev (after 1856 - 1917) was a general in the Russian Imperial army. His sister Maria Vasilievna Belyaeva (1869-?) was married to the Consul general of the Russian Empire in Damascus, Secretary of the Imperial Orthodox Palestine Society Alexey Belyaev (1859-1906). When she was stuck the war zone of World War I in Lausanne, Switzerland, she remained there with her children and, due to the Russian Revolution, never returned.

Addresses
Moscow, Armyansky lane, 4 (Frolov house) 
Moscow, Potapovsky lane, 8 (Golovin estate, Belyaev house)

Bibliography
Chernopyatov V.I. Reports of the Christian Relief Committee of the Russian Red Cross Society, 1885-1890. – Moscow, 1890.

References

1859 births
1920 deaths
Businesspeople from the Russian Empire